Wells-next-the-Sea railway station served the port town of Wells-next-the-Sea in North Norfolk, England. It was opened in 1857 by the Wells & Fakenham Railway, later part of the Great Eastern Railway's Wymondham to Wells branch, and became a junction in 1866 with the arrival of the West Norfolk Junction Railway. It closed in 1964.

Opening 

It was originally planned to have been open on 1 June 1857, but negotiations with the Eastern Counties Railway, which would operate the line, delayed it until 1 December 1857. They hoped that the railway would help reverse the declining fortunes of the town, whose inability to take ships of increasing size saw it overtaken by other ports. The decline continued notwithstanding the construction of a short branch line to Wells Harbour in 1860. In 1862, the Wells & Fakenham Railway became part of the Great Eastern Railway, a move which brought greater importance to the Wells line by providing a north–south connection with London's increasing food markets.

The West Norfolk Junction Railway was the next to come to Wells, on 17 August 1866.

Station facilities 
The main red brick two-storey 'L' shaped Georgian-style station buildings were constructed at right angles to the platform ends and incorporated a stationmaster's residence.

Wells had a combined engine shed and goods shed, with the locomotives having use of the whole shed when not required for goods. This adjoined the main station building on the Wells & Fakenham platform side. In 1929 the original  turntable was replaced by a second-hand  version. This lay just to the north of the station, and was capable of accommodating the former Great Eastern's "Claud Hamilton" locomotives and other 4-4-0 classes, but not the B12s or other large engines. Wells was an outstation of Norwich depot, and there were up to five locomotives based there. The shed officially closed in September 1955 and has since been demolished.

Operations 

Wells was a busy terminal station for almost 100 years, with a dozen or so passenger trains calling each day and goods trains from the harbour. An accident took place at Wells station on 29 May 1879, when the 7:50 pm train from Norwich ran away on the steep gradient approaching the terminus, smashed through the buffers at the end of the line and entered the station building through the porter's room and toilets. No passengers were injured, but a young man named George Cooke was killed in the station toilets. Repairs can still be seen in the brickwork. Messrs Dewing & Kersley opened a corn mill adjacent to the station in 1904, and the smell of animal feedstuffs often wafted into the station to mix with the smoke, steam and hot oil odours given off by the locomotives, and the fishy smells coming from the 'Stiffkey Blues' cockles loaded into the guards' vans of trains.

The post-war boom experienced by the King's Lynn to Hunstanton line was not felt on the West Norfolk Junction Railway, whose inconveniently sited stations contributed to declining passenger traffic. Passenger services between Wells and Heacham were withdrawn from 2 June 1952, but the line remained open to freight. The station closed a little over ten years later when the line from Dereham to Wells closed to passenger traffic on 5 October 1964, freight continuing until the end of the month.

Present day
In 2007 the station building was a second-hand bookshop and pottery, with the site of the platforms an industrial estate known as Great Eastern Way. The old corn mill was used as a furniture warehouse, before being converted into flats. Part of the ground floor is occupied by Wells Antiques Centre and Glaven Veterinary Centre.

Wells and Walsingham Light Railway 

Since 1982, there has been a second station at Wells, the terminus of the narrow gauge Wells and Walsingham Light Railway. This station is to the south of where the original line crossed the main coast road on the level.

References

External links
Platform side of station building, 1976

Railway Station
Disused railway stations in Norfolk
Former Great Eastern Railway stations
Railway stations in Great Britain opened in 1857
Railway stations in Great Britain closed in 1964
Beeching closures in England
1857 establishments in England